Otis Starks (December 3, 1897 – July 16, 1965) was an American Negro league pitcher between 1917 and 1937.

A native of Chattanooga, Tennessee, Starks made his Negro leagues debut in 1917 with the Pennsylvania Red Caps of New York. He went on to enjoy a long career with several teams, including eight seasons with the Brooklyn Royal Giants, where he finished his career in 1937. Starks died in New York, New York in 1965 at age 67.

References

External links
 and Baseball-Reference Black Baseball stats and Seamheads

1897 births
1965 deaths
Bacharach Giants players
Brooklyn Eagles players
Brooklyn Royal Giants players
Chicago American Giants players
Hilldale Club players
Lincoln Giants players
Pennsylvania Red Caps of New York players
Pollock's Cuban Stars players
St. Louis Giants players
20th-century African-American sportspeople
Baseball pitchers
Burials at Long Island National Cemetery